There were two special elections to the United States House of Representatives in 1955 during the 84th United States Congress.

List of elections 
Elections are listed by date and district.

|- 
| 
| Dwight L. Rogers
|  | Democratic
| 1944
|  | Incumbent member-elect died December 1, 1954.New member elected January 11, 1955.Democratic hold.
| nowrap | 

|- 
| 
| John D. Dingell Sr.
|  | Democratic
| 1932
|  | Incumbent died September 19, 1955.Primary elections held November 8, 1855.New member elected December 13, 1955 to finish his father's term.Democratic hold.
| nowrap | 

|}

References 

 
1955